The Only Girl: My Life and Times on the Masthead of Rolling Stone is a 2018 memoir by Robin Green. The book has eight "positive" reviews and two "rave" reviews, according to review aggregator Book Marks.

References

2018 non-fiction books
English-language books
Little, Brown and Company books